The 2011 Halloween nor'easter, sometimes referred to as "Snowtober," "Shocktober,"   "Storm Alfred," and "Oktoberblast," was a large low pressure area that produced unusually early snowfall across the northeastern United States and the Canadian Maritimes. It formed early on October 29 along a cold front to the southeast of the Carolinas. As it moved up the East Coast, its associated snowfall broke records in at least 20 cities for total accumulations, resulting in a rare "white Halloween" two days later.

The storm arrived just two months after Hurricane Irene caused extensive power outages and property damage in the Northeast; with the 2011 New England tornado outbreak also causing damage in Western Massachusetts. It dumped snow on trees that were often still in leaf, adding extra weight, with the ground in some areas still soft from a preceding warm, rainy period that increased the possibility trees could be uprooted. Trees and branches that collapsed caused considerable damage, particularly to power lines, with estimates of storm costs ranging between $1 billion and $3 billion. In all, 3.2 million U.S. residences and businesses in 12 states experienced power outages, with the storm also impacting three Canadian provinces.

Some customers in Connecticut did not get power back until early November; many outages lasted 11 days. Many communities chose to postpone celebrations of Halloween from two days to a week later as a result, or cancel them entirely. Delays in restoring power led to the resignation of the chief operating officer of Connecticut Light & Power amid widespread criticism of the company's mishandling of both the nor'easter and Irene.

Meteorological history

Early on October 28, 2011, a ridge over Canada advected an unseasonably cold air mass across the Mid-Atlantic states and New England; at the same time, a surface low-pressure area began developing along the coast of Louisiana. A cold front moved eastward from the Ohio Valley and exited the East Coast of the United States, developing another low pressure area off the coast of the Carolinas on October 29. The remnants of Hurricane Rina had also been absorbed into the developing system. At the same time, an area of precipitation extended from South Carolina through Pennsylvania, mostly falling as rain with some snow observed at higher elevations. By late that morning, the system was producing precipitation over much of the Mid-Atlantic and New England.

As the system moved to the northeast through the day, it produced widespread snow and winds near hurricane-strength north of the cyclone's warm front over the open waters of the Atlantic Ocean. As it did so, the associated precipitation diminished over New England and moved into Atlantic Canada. By the early morning of November 1, the system had fully moved out to sea. The storm then hit the UK as Cyclone Quinn.

Preparations

Before the storm was at its strongest, local National Weather Service offices issued winter storm warnings from northwestern Virginia through central New England, as well as winter storm watches from central Maryland through central Maine. All warnings were canceled after the storm moved away from the region.

Early on October 29, the Pennsylvania Department of Transportation activated their fleet of salt trucks. In eastern Pennsylvania, the most recent significant snowstorm during October was in 1972. Utility crews prepared additional crews in the event of power outages.  The Delaware Water Gap National Recreation Area closed a road due to the storm's threat. Connecticut governor Dan Malloy opened the state's Emergency Operations Center in Hartford, which included members of the transportation, health, and energy departments. Officials opened 41 shelters in Connecticut. Occupy Wall Street protesters pledged to remain in Lower Manhattan's Zucotti Park despite the weather, obtaining coats and blankets.

Snowfall totals and records
Precipitation began falling in North Carolina and Virginia late on October 28. By early the next day, measurable snowfall had been reported from West Virginia through Maryland, and eventually as far north as Maine. Central Park in Manhattan observed , also a record. As the storm moved into Canada, it dropped rain in Nova Scotia and snow in New Brunswick and Newfoundland.

In Concord, New Hampshire this became the largest 24 hour snowstorm on record.

Impact

The nor'easter storm became the 14th multibillion-dollar weather-related disaster of 2011, breaking the three-year-old record of nine. Across the Northeast, the combination of high winds and wet, heavy snow downed trees, most of which retained their leaves, did extensive damage. In New York City, a thousand trees were estimated to have fallen in Central Park, far more than had been damaged by Hurricane Irene two months earlier, just as had been reported in Connecticut. The New York Botanical Garden in the Bronx reported that 2,200 trees in the Thain Family Forest, its old-growth forest and the only one remaining in the city from the era prior to European colonization, were damaged. Downed trees caused widespread power outages, leaving over 3 million people without power. In Central Park workers put a priority on making the park safe for the annual New York City Marathon the following weekend.

Fatalities
Traffic accidents killed at least six people. Two were electrocuted by downed power lines. Overall, there were 39 deaths.

Transportation
The storm affected transportation across the Northeast. Two rail services were closed in the New York area, and Amtrak service across the region was either delayed or canceled. NJ Transit suspended service on the Morris and Essex Lines until November 1 due to downed wires and branches, and even then was only able to restore service as far west as Lake Hopatcong. North of New York City, Metro-North suspended commuter rail service on the Harlem Line north of North White Plains, leaving passengers marooned on a train at Southeast for 11 hours when fallen trees blocked the tracks in both directions. Service was also suspended on the Port Jervis Line and the New Canaan, Danbury and Waterbury branches of the New Haven Line. Service on the Port Jervis Line and electrified portions of the Harlem Line was restored on Monday; bus service replaced trains between Southeast and Wassaic and on the Danbury and Waterbury branches for the rest of the week.

The storm also disrupted air travel from Pennsylvania through Connecticut. Officials at Newark International Airport canceled all flights after 4 pm on October 29, and flights out of New York's two major airports were delayed by up to five hours. Some flights bound for New York were diverted to Hartford. Several JetBlue flights departing from Bradley International Airport there were stranded on the tarmac for up to seven hours due to the hazardous conditions.

Some roads were also affected. Along the Jersey Shore, the nor'easter produced coastal flooding that left Ventnor Heights isolated. Officials closed a portion of the Black Horse Pike in West Atlantic City due to flooding. Further north, the flooding closed five New Jersey state highways in Monmouth and Ocean counties.

Sports
Sporting events on Saturday, mostly college and high school football games, were also impacted. Penn State officials limited parking at its home game in State College to 1,500 spaces due to the inclement weather. It was the first Nittany Lions home October football game with measurable snow since record-keeping began in 1896. At West Point, New York, Army defeated Fordham 55–0 in its first home game played in snow since 1985. On Long Island where a windswept mixture of heavy snow and rain fell, a match between Plainview – Old Bethpage John F. Kennedy High School and Valley Stream Central High School was cancelled after 15 players were treated for hypothermia, prompting the former school district to reconsider game cancellation policies. At another football game on Long Island 10 players were checked and some treated for the condition.  Several players at Farmingdale High School reported extreme fatigue for several weeks following playing in the storm.

Halloween
Many traditional Halloween activities were affected by the storm. In communities without electricity, where tree limbs and wires were down, trick-or-treating was delayed until days when it was expected to be back and repairs had made the streets safer. This also occurred in communities where electricity was still fully or partially on but the streets still may have been unsafe. In Sleepy Hollow, New York, a popular destination for the holiday since Washington Irving's classic short story, "The Legend of Sleepy Hollow" is set there, Halloween events were canceled due to the storm and its aftermath. On the other hand, another popular Halloween destination, Salem, Massachusetts, location of the 1692 witch trials, was unaffected due to its minimal snowfall. 
 
Some families were able to compensate for the lost Halloween. They took their children to trick-or-treat in other communities that still had electricity. Residents of Glen Rock, New Jersey, organized a "trunk-or-treat" party at the local high school's football field, where children went around to parked sport-utility vehicles. Since many schools had snow days, and there was little to distract children without electricity, many parents insisted on going ahead with the holiday. "You can't cancel Halloween," said a woman in Fairfield, New Jersey. "The kids are all hyped up. They had no school because there's no electricity and this and that." A boy in Lexington, Massachusetts said he now planned to "buy some candy and eat it myself."

At UMass Amherst, the storm caused a power outage over a traditional party weekend at the college that lasted throughout most of the night on Saturday, October 29. While power was largely restored by Sunday, October 30, the campus canceled classes on October 31, and the UMass Campus Center served as a rest location for students and area residents who were still without power. Amherst College saw similar conditions, with the university newspaper reporting that students were taking refuge from power outages in Valentine Dining Hall, with one student describing the response as similar to hurricanes in her home state of Florida.

Proposals in some communities to hold Halloween the following weekend, or whenever conditions returned to normal, met with protest from some parents. Some considered the October 31 date to be immutable and non-negotiable, so children would have to wait for 2012. "I don't have control over the calendar, so Halloween is on Halloween, which is the 31st", said Pat Murphy, mayor of New Milford, Connecticut. She noted the town had managed to celebrate the holiday that day on its village green despite considerable storm damage and continued power outages. Others had already allowed their children some trick-or-treating, and did not want them to indulge in candy a second time within the week.

Many school districts were forced by the storm to use up their remaining allotted snow days for the school year, after Hurricane Irene and Tropical Storm Lee had required some be used near the beginning of the year. The Weston, Connecticut, public schools had already used nine snow days as of November 2, five more than its schedule allowed. Since more snow days would inevitably be used during the upcoming winter, they predicted that  vacation periods planned for later in the year would have to be shortened or canceled, or the school year would have to be extended.

The storm came at a critical time for high school seniors preparing college applications for early decision, and 76 colleges and universities moved those deadlines back to compensate. In Connecticut, Weston High School, which had power, opened its library for students wishing to study or work on their applications; movies were shown in the auditorium.

Electrical outages
Approximately 1.7 million customers in the Northeast were still without electricity three days after the storm. Temperatures in the region warmed up to above  during the day, but went down to near freezing at night. As powerless houses grew cold, residents bundled up and kept under blankets, went to stay or visit with others who had electricity, or used their car heaters to temporarily warm-up. Some, frustrated by long blackouts after other recent storms, considered leaving the region or moving to cities where power lines were underground.
About half a million households in New Jersey lost electricity, prompting a state of emergency declaration from governor Chris Christie. He had himself suffered outages both at his house in Mendham and the governor's mansion, Drumthwacket, near Princeton.

In Connecticut, Governor Dannel Malloy declared a state of emergency late on October 29, after 830,000 people lost power, breaking the record set after Hurricane Irene. In the Danbury area, outages were so prolonged that seven school districts had to cancel classes for the following week. A state of emergency was also declared in Massachusetts, which allowed for the activation of the state's National Guard as well as other emergency measures. Due to the power outages and downed trees shortly before Halloween, at least three towns in the state advised delaying trick-or-treating. In New Hampshire, officials opened seven shelters for people who lost heating during the storm. The early snowfall allowed for the opening of ski resorts in Vermont and Maine. 
 
At a November 1 press conference, Governor Malloy estimated that damages in Connecticut would exceed $3 billion. Two days later, close to 700,000 homes and businesses remained without power. A week after the storm, almost 150,000 customers of the state's two utilities had not yet had power restored. Customers still suffering outages continued to cope as best they could, by sleeping at the homes of friends who had already had their electricity restored, taking showers at work and storing perishable foods outside. Power was not restored to all the customers who had lost it in the storm until November 9.

Many Connecticut residents were angry with the state's electric utilities, particularly Connecticut Light & Power (CL&P), which serves most of the state, for the long delays in restoring service. By the weekend after the storm, in comparison, most customers in other affected states had already gotten their electricity back. Malloy said they had "missed their own target" and ordered an investigation into their preparation and restoration efforts to be led by James Lee Witt, director of the Federal Emergency Management Agency during the Clinton Administration. An Avon man complained he had not seen any crews in his area since the storm. Some commentators felt Malloy was being too lenient with CL&P, noting that the company had cut its maintenance budget in the preceding year and that smaller public utilities, such as that serving the city of Norwich, had experienced far less power loss and for far less time despite CL&P's customers paying the highest rates in the contiguous United States. Similar complaints had been made after the company had taken a long time to restore service after Hurricane Irene, and three weeks after the nor'easter, Jeff Butler, the company's CEO, resigned.

A month after the storm, Malloy released Witt's report, which concluded that "CL&P was not prepared for an event of this size". The utility had planned for a worst-case scenario in which 100,000 customers lost power, only one-eighth of those actually affected by the nor'easter. While the report noted that such a storm had not hit in 25 years when the company's emergency plan was drawn up in June, it nevertheless faulted CL&P for merely telling its emergency crews to be on call that weekend, instead of having them wait at predetermined locations. As a result, it was harder to mobilize them when the effects turned out to be far worse than they anticipated despite warnings from the NWS using terms such as "historic" and "catastrophic" prior to the storm.

The report also said that CL&P did not ask for crews from neighboring states until after the storm, at which point other New England utilities were also seeking help from them. "Because of that poor preparation, it's not surprising that they didn't, or that they couldn't, respond with enough boots on the ground when the worst-case scenario was compounded by a factor of eight", said Malloy. The report did praise some aspects of CL&P's response, such as its short call wait times, speedy repairs by crews once they reached their job sites and the absence of death or serious injury among responding utility crews.

See also

 1991 Perfect Storm – A historic nor'easter that formed 20 years prior
 1991 Halloween blizzard
 November 2012 nor'easter

References

External links

2011 meteorology
2011 natural disasters in the United States
2011 in Connecticut
Natural disasters in Connecticut
2011 in New York (state)
Natural disasters in New York (state)
2011 in Maryland
Natural disasters in Maryland
2011 in Massachusetts
Natural disasters in Massachusetts
2011 in Maine
Natural disasters in Maine
2011 in New Hampshire
Natural disasters in New Hampshire
2011 in Pennsylvania
Natural disasters in Pennsylvania
2011 in New Jersey
Natural disasters in New Jersey
2011 in Virginia
Natural disasters in Virginia
2011 in Rhode Island
Natural disasters in Rhode Island
2011 in West Virginia
Natural disasters in West Virginia
2011 in Vermont
Natural disasters in Vermont
2011 Halloween
2011 disasters in Canada
October 2011 events in North America
November 2011 events in North America